Oran Beecher Davis (April 25, 1872 – May 16, 1960) was a Canadian politician. He served in the Legislative Assembly of New Brunswick as member of the Liberal party representing Victoria County from 1925 to 1930.

References

20th-century Canadian politicians
1872 births
1960 deaths
New Brunswick Liberal Association MLAs